Kieron Morris (born 3 June 1994) is an English footballer who plays for Tranmere Rovers.

Career
Morris was born in Hereford and grew up in Leominster, Herefordshire. Part of the Hereford United Centre of Excellence, he played youth football for local club Leominster Minors before being spotted by Manchester United's scouting network. Morris trialled with Manchester United frequently over a few years, but a contract offer never materialised. He eventually began his career with Walsall and made his professional debut on 28 August 2013 in a 3–1 defeat against Stoke City in the Football League Cup.

During the 2012–13 season Morris spent time on loan at Conference North club Worcester City, making eight appearances and scoring one goal, and the following season he had a loan spell at Leamington, where he played four league games. In January 2014 Morris, along with fellow Walsall youth prospects Matt Preston and Danny Griffiths joined up with Icelandic side ÍBV—managed by former Walsall player Sigurður Ragnar Eyjólfsson—on trial. All three played in a 2–1 loss against Stjarnan in a pre-season tournament, but were not taken on by ÍBV and subsequently returned to Walsall.

Morris joined Wrexham on loan until the end of the season on 30 January 2015. During his loan spell with the Red Dragons, he was impressive as he scored a brace in Wrexham's FA Trophy Semi Final 2nd leg victory over Torquay United on 28 February 2015 as well as the winning goal in the Cross-border derby against Chester on 7 March 2015.

He was released by Walsall at the end of the 2018–19 season., before signing for Tranmere Rovers on 26 June 2019.

In May 2020, Morris was named ' Tranmere Player of the Season' for the 2019/20 season.

Morris signed a new two-year contract with the option for a third year at the end of the 2021–22 season.

Career statistics

Honours
Wrexham
FA Trophy runner-up: 2014–15

Tranmere Rovers
EFL League Two play-offs: 2019
EFL Trophy runner-up: 2020–21

Individual
Tranmere Rovers Player of the Year: 2019–20

References

External links

1994 births
Living people
Sportspeople from Hereford
English footballers
Association football forwards
Walsall F.C. players
Worcester City F.C. players
Leamington F.C. players
Wrexham A.F.C. players
Tranmere Rovers F.C. players
English Football League players
National League (English football) players
21st-century English people